The Son (Danish: Sønnen) is a 1953 Danish family film directed by Torben Anton Svendsen and starring Ib Schønberg, Lise Wolst and Frits Helmuth.

Cast
 Ib Schønberg as Krovært Christian Christiansen  
 Lise Wolst as Sonja  
Frits Helmuth as Simon  
 Kate Mundt as Ketty  
 Gunnar Lauring as Tømmerhandleren 'Kongen'  
 Karin Nellemose as Fru Rudi  
 Inge Hvid-Møller as Anna  
 Kjeld Jacobsen as Max  
 Hans-Henrik Krause as Niels  
 Karl Stegger as Kriminalbetjent
 Maria Garland as Marie  
 Elith Pio as Kredslægen 
 Aage Winther-Jørgensen as Sofus  
 Preben Lerdorff Rye as Generalen  
 Inge Ketti as Søster  
 Bodil Lindorff as Laurine  
 Jakob Nielsen as Overbetjent  
 Poul Secher as Stoffer  
 Victor Montell as Værten 
 Poul Juhl as Eksportør  
 Paul Hagen as Salgschauffør  
 Jytte Ibsen as En ung mor  
 Henry Nielsen

References

Bibliography 
 Morten Piil. Gyldendals danske filmguide. Gyldendal A/S, 2008.

External links 
 

1953 films
1950s Danish-language films
Danish black-and-white films